Abū l-Ḥārith Ghaylān b. ʿUqba, generally known as Dhū al-Rumma   ('the one with the frayed cord', possibly referring to a cord amulet; c. 696 – c. 735) was a Bedouin poet and a rāwī of al-Rā'ī al-Numayrī (died c. 715). In the assessment of Nefeli Papoutsakis, 'he stands at the end of a long poetic tradition which, for the most part, expressed the ethos and intellectual preoccupations of the pre-Islamic tribal society of Bedouin Arabs—a fact reflected in the saying of Abū 'Amr b. al-'Alā' that "poetry was closed with D̲ū r-Rumma" '.

Life

Little reliable information about Dhu ar-Rumma's life is available, but various later sources suggest the following: his mother was called Ẓabya and of the Asad tribe. He himself belonged to the ʿAdī tribe, which was part of the Ribāb confederation, and therefore probably lived in Al-Yamāma and its vicinity. He had three brothers, who also composed poetry: Hishām, Masʿūd, and Jirfās. He seems to have spent part of his life in the cities of Iraq, notably Basra and Kufa, where it seems he spent time with such poets as al-Farazdaq (d. c. 728 CE), Jarīr ibn 'Atiya (d. 728×29 CE), Ruʾba (d. 762 CE), and al-Kumayt (d. 743 CE), and the scholars Abū ʿAmr b. al-ʿAlāʾ (c. 770×72 CE), ʿĪsā b. ʿUmar al-Thaqafī (d. 766 CE), and Ḥammād al-Rāwiya (d. 772×73 CE). He may have been a professional poet. He fell in love with and later married a woman called Mayya, from the Banū Minqar (Tamīm), but his odes also celebrate one Ḥarqā', of the 'Āmir b. Ṣa'ṣa'a.

Work

His extensive diwan is widely studied. Its themes and forms included love poetry (in the nasīb and ghazal forms), self-praise (fakhr) about himself and his tribe, eulogy, invective, and riddles.

In the assessment of Nefeli Papoutsakis,
Contemporary views of his poetry were generally negative: he is said to have been incompetent in satire and eulogy (al-Jumaḥī, 551; al-Balādhurī, 10:238; al-Iṣfahānī 18:31), an unjustified criticism, due to the prevalence of travel fakhr in his poetry. He is, nevertheless, regarded as the best poet, in Islamic times, at drawing comparisons (al-Jumaḥī, 549; al-Iṣfahānī, 18:9). Despite all the reported criticisms, his poetry never ceased to be studied and was often quoted in lexicographical and grammatical works, as well as in adab literature, which speaks for its high artistic quality and popularity. Many prominent figures in Arabic letters—such as the poets al-Ṣanawbarī (d. c.334/945) and al-Maʿarrī (d. 449/1058), who wrote commentaries on his work, and literati, including the caliph Hārūn al-Rashīd (r. 170–93/786–809)—admired his talent. Dhū l-Rumma’s poetry represents a mature phase in the development of the Bedouin poetic tradition but also marks the end of its supremacy. This is succinctly expressed in Abū ʿAmr b. al-ʿAlāʾ’s saying that “poetry came to an end with Dhū l-Rumma” (al-Iṣfahānī, 18:9).

List of poems

Editions and translations

 ʿAbd al-Qaddūs Abū Ṣāliḥ (ed.), Dīwān Dhī l-Rumma. Sharḥ Abī Naṣr al-Bāhilī, riwāyat Thaʿlab. Based on the editor's Ph.D. thesis.
 1st edn, 3 vols (Beirut 1972), vol. 1, vol. 2, vol. 3.
 2nd edn, 3 vols (Beirut 1982), archive.org scan, machine-readable text.
 3rd edn, 3 vols (Beirut 1994).
 Muṭī al-Babbīlī (ed.), Diwān Dhū l-Rummah (Damascus, 1964).
 Carlile Henry Hayes Macartney (ed.), The Dîwân of Ghailân Ibn ʿUqbah known as Dhu ’r-Rummah (Cambridge: Cambridge University Press, 1919).
 Michael Sells, Desert tracings. Six classic Arabian odes by ʿAlqama, Shánfara, Labíd, ʿAntara, Al-Aʿsha, and Dhu al-Rúmma (Middletown CT 1989), pp. 67–76.
 Selections from the Diwan of Gailan ibn ʻUqba Dhuʹl Rumma, trans. by Arthur Wormhoudt ([Oskaloosa, Iowa]: William Penn College, 1982),  (text in Arabic and English, on opposite pages; notes in English)

References

Asian poets
Male poets
Place of birth unknown
Year of birth uncertain
Year of death uncertain
690s births
730s deaths
8th-century Arabic poets
8th-century Arabs
8th-century people from the Umayyad Caliphate